Muzaffarpur District is one of the thirty-eight districts of Bihar state, India. Muzaffarpur district is part of and also the headquarters of Tirhut Division Tirhut is the ancient name of all of northern Bihar.

History 
Muzaffarpur was a part of the ancient Vajjika League, one of the principal mahājanapadas of Ancient India.

Muzaffarpur fostered political leaders and statesmen alike among whom were Maghfoor Ahmad Ajazi,  George Fernandes, Janki Ballabh Shastri, a great Maithili writer Parmanandan Shashtri and Devesh Chandra Thakur. Bajjika and Maithili languages are spoken in the district.

In 1972 both Sitamarhi and Vaishali districts were split from Muzaffarpur.

Geography
Muzaffarpur district is served by rivers Gandak, Budhi Gandak, Bagmati and Lakhandei. 
Many streams pass through the district. The area has been prone to floods. The district lies in the fertile region of Gangetic plain.

Politics 
  

|}

Economy
GDP Per capita Income of Muzaffarpur is $2,507 and total GDP of District is $5 Billion as by 2021 Reports which is 4.7% of Bihar GDP.

Lychee

The litchi crop, which is available from May to June, is mainly cultivated in the districts of Muzaffarpur and surrounding districts, in an area of about 25,800 hectares producing about 300,000 tonnes every year. Litchi  is exported to big cities like Bombay, Kolkata and to other countries. India's share in the world litchi market amounts to less than 1%. The name of the litchi produced in quality.

Industry 
It has many industries ranging from small to big. Prabhat Zarda Factory, Ganesh Foundries Limited, Bharat Wagon and Engineering, N.T.P.C., Kanti Thermal Power Station, Bihar Drugs & Organic Chemicals Ltd., Muzaffarpur – a unit of IDPL, units of Leather Development Corporation, Muzaffarpur Dairy, a unit of the Bihar State Dairy Corporation unit Bihar State Cooperative Milk Producers’ Federation Ltd., Muzaffarpur producing Sudha brand packaged milk are the major industries located in Muzaffarpur city and its periphery. The above industries have generated considerable employment and have also been helpful in establishing a number of small industries including a few cottage industries. The most important item that is manufactured in Muzaffarpur town is railway wagon. Muzaffarpur city is an important centre for the wholesale cloth trade. Agriculture-based industries such as sugar mills and Britannia Biscuits have newly been established in city.

Demographics

According to the 2011 census Muzaffarpur district has a population of 4,801,062, roughly equal to the nation of Singapore or the US state of Alabama. This gives it a ranking of 24th th in India (out of a total of 640). Its population growth rate over the decade 2001-2011 was 28.14%. Muzaffarpur has a sex ratio of 900 females for every 1000 males, and a literacy rate of 63.4%. Scheduled Castes and Scheduled Tribes make up 15.66% and 0.12% of the population respectively.

Languages 

At the time of the 2011 Census of India, 48.33% of the population in the district spoke Hindi, 7.65% Urdu, 3.54% Bhojpuri and 1.33% Maithili as their first language. 39.01% of the population recorded their language as 'Others' under Hindi, mainly Bajjika.

References

External links 

 
Tirhut division
Districts of Bihar
1875 establishments in India